Napoleon trail system is a natural area in Innisfail, Alberta, Canada. Motorized vehicles are not allowed on the trails, and night time exploring of the trails is not advised.

From 1896–1898 Poplar Grove graveyard moved to the present site, (Innisfail Memorial Cemetery), the excavation and relocation of sites took two years to complete.

Wes Browning murder

Several unmarked graves were never located, the approximate number is between 7–16 graves. Some of the relatives have expressed their wishes to not disturb the grounds further, and to leave those unmarked sites as is.  It is believed the archway pictured is the entrance to the burial grounds. Unexplained to this day is how and why the natural growth of the forest into the arch way. Also unexplained is how the branches on the arch reach towards the heavens and not towards the ground where the unmarked graves lay.

Legend has it the bludgeoned body of the orphaned 15-year-old, brutally murdered in the 19th century, lay in one of those unmarked graves. The boy is believed to be Wes Browning whose parents died when he was 5 years old. He then spent the rest of his days living in the basement of the St. Marks church. His murderer was never apprehended.

In 1945, another attempt to locate unmarked gravesites was funded by an anonymous donor.  Two gravesites were located and relocated to the new site. No other graves were found, and no other attempt has been made to locate and relocate those graves. Town council, in 1957 deemed Napoleon Trails as a protected and sacred area.

In the summer of 2006 an old building was discovered just off the trails with its roof in pieces from being smashed open by a tree. There was several blood stains on the floors and walls this was believed to be the site of Wes Browning's old home where his parents may have been murdered, the roof being smashed open was decided not be the cause of any "murders" in the home due to the age of the tree, the site was later demolished in 2009 to make way for a new highway into the town.

References 

 Dr. George Kemp House Historical Document: 1092-33-4 (Archived at the house 1947)

Municipal Historic Resources in Alberta
Innisfail, Alberta